Sinú, río de pasiones (English: River of Passions) is a Colombian telenovela produced and broadcast by Caracol Televisión from January 18 to April 19, 2016. It stars Natalia Jerez, Mario Espitia, Jacqueline Arenal, Carlos Enrique Almirante and Jorge Cao as the main protagonists.

Cast 
 Natalia Jerez as Lina María Henao
 Mario Espitia as Cristian Dangond
 Jacqueline Arenal as Sonia Mascote
 Carlos Enrique Almirante as Felipe Guerra
 Sofia Araujo as Elizabeth Puello
 Diana Hoyos as Leonilde Amador
 Abel Rodríguez as Anibal Dangond
 Jorge Cao as Carlos Puello
 Myriam De Lourdes as Claudia Escamilla
 Ricardo Mejía as Marcos Galarza
 Katherine Castrillón as Lizbeth Cruz
 José Narváez as Jose Diaz Granados
 Viña Machado as Mery Ortega
 Luis Eduardo Motoa as Gerardo Henao
 Jorge Enrique Abello as Coronel Arteaga
 Fernando Solórzano as Ortega
 Juliana Galvis as Luisa
 John Bolivar as Harald
 Walter Luengas as lawyer 
 Victor Hugo Morant as Ortega's lawyer
 Gabriel Ochoa as Mauricio
 David Noreña as prosecutor
 Victor Cifuentes as judge
 Eibar Gutiérrez as The Master of Vallenato
 Sthepanie Abello as journalist
 John Mario Rivera as The Propio
 Luis Carlos Fuquen as Héctor Maya 
 Ricardo Vélez as Botero
 Linda Baldrich as Elsa Mogollón
 Jairo Ordoñez as Siete
 Zulma Rey
 Fernando Lara 
 Mauricio Montoya 
 Jorge Sanchez

Broadcast 
The series premiered on January 18, 2016, in Colombia on Caracol Televisión.

References

External links 
  

2016 telenovelas
Colombian telenovelas
Caracol Televisión telenovelas
2016 Colombian television series debuts
2016 Colombian television series endings
Spanish-language telenovelas
Television shows set in Colombia